Eschscholzia minutiflora is a species of poppy known by the common name pygmy poppy.

It is native to the deserts of the southwestern United States and northern Mexico. This wildflower is an annual herb growing from a patch of segmented leaves with divided, rounded leaflets. The thin, erect or nodding stems may be very short or up to 35 centimeters tall. They bear small poppy flowers with petals varying in size from only a few millimeters long or up to two and a half centimeters in length, and bright yellow in color, sometimes with orange spotting. The fruit is a capsule 3 to 6 centimeters long containing tiny brown to black seeds.

The species contains three subspecies:
Eschscholzia minutiflora subsp. minutiflora has the smallest flowers (petals 0.3-1.0 cm long), the broadest range, and n = 18 chromosomes.
Eschscholzia minutiflora subsp. covillei (Greene) C.Clark has flowers of intermediate size (petals 0.6-1.8 cm long), n = 12 chromosomes, and is found in the Mojave Desert.
Eschscholzia minutiflora subsp. twisselmannii C.Clark has the largest flowers (petals 1.0-2.6 cm long), n = 6 chromosomes, and occurs in the El Paso and Rand mountains of the Mojave Desert.

External links

Jepson Manual Treatment - Eschscholzia minutiflora
Eschscholzia minutiflora - Photo gallery

minutiflora
Flora of Northwestern Mexico
Flora of the California desert regions
Flora of Nevada
Flora of Utah
Flora of Arizona
Flora of the Sonoran Deserts
Natural history of the Mojave Desert
Flora without expected TNC conservation status